Raymond Stevens (born 26 July 1963 in Camberley, Surrey) is a male retired judoka from the United Kingdom.

Judo career
Stevens started learning Judo at the age of ten and gained a black belt in Judo at the age of 16.

He was twice a champion of Great Britain, winning the middleweight division at the British Judo Championships in 1984 and 1986. In 1986, he won the gold medal in the 86kg weight category at the judo demonstration sport event as part of the 1986 Commonwealth Games.

Stevens competed in two consecutive Summer Olympics, starting in 1992, when he won the silver medal in the men's half heavyweight division (– 95 kg), in the final he was defeated by Hungary's Antal Kovács. He represented England and won a gold medal in the 95 kg half-heavyweight category, at the 1990 Commonwealth Games in Auckland, New Zealand.

He holds the rank of 7th Dan in Judo awarded to him on 10 September 2015 and is the Vice Chairman of the British Judo Association London Area. and in 2008 he was the first person to receive a black belt in Brazilian jiu-jitsu from Roger Gracie, he subsequently received his 2nd Dan in 2015. He opened his own purpose built Dojo in September 2017 in South London;   located in Merton, the academy provides martial arts tuition for kids and adults  in Judo, Brazilian Jiu Jitsu, No-Gi, Wrestling & Kickboxing.

References

 British Olympic Committee

English male judoka
Judoka at the 1992 Summer Olympics
Judoka at the 1996 Summer Olympics
Olympic silver medallists for Great Britain
Olympic judoka of Great Britain
1963 births
Living people
People from Camberley
Olympic medalists in judo
English practitioners of Brazilian jiu-jitsu
Medalists at the 1992 Summer Olympics
Commonwealth Games medallists in judo
Commonwealth Games gold medallists for England
Judoka at the 1990 Commonwealth Games
Medallists at the 1990 Commonwealth Games